Eupithecia ponderata is a moth in the family Geometridae. It is found in Armenia.

References

Moths described in 1981
ponderata
Moths of Asia